Karl McKay Wiegand (June 2, 1873 – March 12, 1942) was an American botanist who headed the Department of Botany at Cornell University for 28 years. He was a member of the Botanical Society of America and served as its president in 1939.

References

External links

1873 births
1942 deaths
Cornell University faculty
20th-century American botanists